Pádraig Peter Harrington (born 31 August 1971) is an Irish professional golfer who plays on the European Tour, PGA Tour and the PGA Tour Champions. He has won three major championships: The Open Championship in 2007 and 2008 and the PGA Championship, also in 2008. He spent over 300 weeks in the top-10 of the world rankings, and reached a career-high ranking of third in July 2008. Harrington was a member of six consecutive Ryder Cup teams between 1999 and 2010. In 2024 he will be an inductee of the World Golf Hall of Fame.

Background
Harrington was born in Dublin, Ireland, the youngest of five sons of Patrick and Breda Harrington. His father, "Paddy" (1933–2005), a Garda who played Gaelic football for Cork in the 1950s, was also a boxer and hurler, and played to a five handicap in golf.

He grew up in Rathfarnham, an area on Dublin's southside and the birthplace of two other professional golfers, Paul McGinley and Peter Lawrie. Harrington attended the same local secondary school as McGinley (though not in the same year), giving their school, Coláiste Éanna, the unique distinction of having produced two Ryder Cup captains. Encouraged by his brothers and father, Harrington's interest and passion for golf grew as he developed his game at nearby Stackstown G.C.

Professional career

European Tour (1996–2007)
After a successful amateur career, including winning the Walker Cup with the Great Britain & Ireland team in his third appearance in 1995, Harrington turned professional later that year, joining the European Tour in 1996. Harrington came to professional golf at a relatively late age, having studied accountancy at university for a number of years while playing high-standard amateur golf. He was unsure whether to turn professional, initially doubting his skills.

His first victory came quickly, in the 1996 Peugeot Spanish Open, his 10th start on the European Tour. But for the next few years the most remarkable thing about his career was the number of times he finished second in European Tour events without ever bettering that position, including four second places in five events in late 1999. With these runners up finishes Harrington qualified to make his Ryder Cup debut in 1999. During this period outside of the European Tour circuit Harrington won the 1998 Irish PGA Championship.

However, in 2000 Harrington discovered a winning touch with two European Tour wins at the Brazil São Paulo 500 Years Open in April, and the BBVA Open Turespaña Masters Comunidad de Madrid in October. With these wins Harrington finished 7th on the European Tour Order of Merit for the second time equaling his 1999 finish.

In 2001 Harrington won his fourth tournament on the European Tour at the Volvo Masters Andalucia, this win and 6 runners up finishes in 2001 lifted Harrington to a then career high year end finish of second on the European Tour's Order of Merit.

2002 was another successful year on the European Tour with particular success towards the end of the season including winning at the Dunhill Links Championship in October, having birdied the final hole to get into a playoff with Eduardo Romero. This win and a further 9 top ten finishes earned Harrington a second-place finish on the European Tour's Order of Merit for the second consecutive season. This form earned Harrington a second Ryder Cup appearance at the 2002 Ryder Cup hosted at The Belfry, in the final day singles Harrington, playing in match 5, won an important point against Mark Calcavecchia helping Europe to victory and regain the cup by a score of 15.5 to 12.5.

Harrington continued this winning form into 2003 winning the first event of the 2003 season at the BMW Asian Open in November 2002. Following Harrington's success in 2001 and 2002 he was invited to, and won, the 2002 Target World Challenge, an unofficial event in the USA hosted by Tiger Woods, whilst this is not a PGA Tour event it marked Harrington's first win in the United States. His winning form continued into the new year winning the Deutsche Bank Players Championship of Europe in May 2003. With these two wins Harrington finished third on the 2003 European Tour Order of Merit.

Harrington won a further two events on the European tour in 2004 at the Omega Hong Kong Open in December 2003 and the Linde German Masters in September 2004. Harrington finished the season 3rd on the European Tour's Order of Merit, this was the 4th consecutive year in which he was within the year end top-5 and the 6th consecutive year in the top-10. Harrington once again qualified for the 2004 Ryder Cup, hosted at Oakland Hills Country Club where he was part of a European team that defeated the United States by the largest winning margin by a European team in the history of the event.

In 2005 having joined the PGA Tour (see below), Harrington played fewer events on the European Tour and experienced his first winless year on the tour since 1999. In 2006 Harrington was once again a winner on the European Tour at the 2006 Alfred Dunhill Links Championship, this was his second links golf win having also won the event in 2002 and was a prelude for his future Open Championship success. Following this Harrington won the 2006 European Tour Order of Merit,  coming after a titanic battle with Paul Casey and David Howell, which was won on the last hole of the last event. Sergio García bogeyed the 72nd hole in the season ending Volvo Masters to give Harrington a share of second place which earned him enough money to leapfrog Paul Casey to 1st place on the Order of Merit.

In 2007 Harrington won the Irish Open for the first time, in doing so Harrington became the first home winner of the Irish Open for 25 years.

Harrington won the European Tour Golfer of the Year award in 2007 and 2008.

In both 2003 and 2004 he was the runner up in The Players Championship, and in the latter year he won enough money on the PGA Tour as a non-member to earn an invitation to the end of season Tour Championship.

PGA Tour
He took membership of the PGA Tour in 2005 and in March he won his first PGA Tour official money event at the Honda Classic, where he beat Vijay Singh and Joe Ogilvie in a sudden-death playoff. In late June, Harrington snatched the Barclays Classic from Jim Furyk with a spectacular  eagle putt on the final hole for his second PGA Tour win. Two weeks later his father died from oesophageal cancer on 11 July, the Monday night preceding the 2005 Open Championship, forcing Harrington's withdrawal.

Harrington spent over 300 weeks in the world top ten between 2001 and 2010. and achieved his best ranking of third following his second Open Championship victory. He has also played for Europe in six Ryder Cups; losing in 1999 and 2008, but winning in 2002, 2004, 2006 and 2010. He has also won the par-3 contest at Augusta National, held the day before The Masters, in 2003 (tie), 2004 and 2012 (tie).

Major championship breakthrough

At the 2007 Open Championship, Harrington defeated Sergio García in a four-hole playoff at Carnoustie Golf Links, becoming the first Irishman to win The Open Championship in 60 years, and the first ever from the Republic of Ireland. Both players went into the playoff having shot a 7-under 277 for the championship. Harrington subsequently won by one stroke in the playoff.

A year later at the 2008 Open Championship, it was unclear if he would get a chance to defend his Open title at Royal Birkdale as eight days prior to the event he injured his wrist. But Harrington successfully defended his title, overcoming a 2-shot deficit to Greg Norman with a final round 69. He shot a four-under-par 32 on the back nine, which enabled him to pull away from Norman and Ian Poulter. His eagle on the par-5 17th all but sealed the tournament. He is the first European golfer since James Braid in 1906 to retain the Claret Jug. The win moved him from fourteenth to third in the world rankings, behind only Tiger Woods and Phil Mickelson.

Just three weeks after winning the Open Championship, Harrington won the PGA Championship over the South Course of the Oakland Hills Country Club, for his third major. Although at five over par after two rounds, he shot eight under par for the weekend, carding successive scores of 66 in the third and fourth rounds. His three under par 277 was two shots ahead of Sergio García and Ben Curtis. Harrington became the first European to win the PGA Championship in 78 years (Tommy Armour in 1930), and was the first winner from Ireland.

Aside from Tiger Woods, who has won consecutive majors three times (2000, 2002, and 2006), Harrington was the first golfer to win two majors in the same year since Mark O'Meara in 1998 and the first to win consecutive majors in the same year since Nick Price in 1994. A feat that has since been achieved by Rory McIlroy in 2014, winning the Open Championship and PGA Championship, as well as Jordan Spieth who won the Masters and the U.S. Open in 2015.

Harrington's victory in the PGA Championship secured his position as the number one player in Europe, earning him a spot in the 2008 European Ryder Cup team under captain Nick Faldo.

2009: First winless year for a decade
Harrington started his 2009 season with a tied-fifth finish in the Abu Dhabi Golf Championship on the European Tour. He then went through a tough period in his career, missing the cut at the AT&T Pebble Beach National Pro-Am, as well as the Northern Trust Open on the PGA Tour. He finished tied-11th at the Arnold Palmer Invitational in what would be one of his better results in the early part of 2009. He arrived at the 2009 Masters Tournament hoping to join Ben Hogan and Tiger Woods as the only players to win three consecutive professional majors. Harrington started with a 3-under-par first round, but eventually faded over the weekend, finishing tied for 35th place. His struggles continued in the succeeding months, as he missed the cut at five of his next six events, including The 3 Irish Open and the U.S. Open. It was during this period that he announced that he was working on swing changes with coach Bob Torrance.

Harrington arrived at The Open Championship at Turnberry hoping to complete a hat-trick of Open wins, a feat that has only been achieved since the 1880s by Peter Thomson. He ended up finishing tied for 65th place. At the WGC-Bridgestone Invitational he was involved in a final day head-to-head between himself and World number one Tiger Woods. Harrington led by one shot playing the 16th hole, but he racked up a triple-bogey to Woods' birdie and he finished in joint 2nd place. The following week Harrington, the defending champion, played the first two rounds with Woods at the PGA Championship. He shot a first round 68, ending one shot behind the leader Woods. Rounds of 73 and 69 left him two shots behind Woods. He was in contention in the final round, until he made an 8 at the par-3 8th hole. He ended in a tie for 10th. He finished in the top-10 in all four FedEx Cup playoff events, before further top-10s in Europe and the States before the end of the season. He ended the year winless on the European and PGA Tours for the first time since 1999.

2010–present

Harrington missed the cut in three out of the four majors in 2010. In an inconsistent season, he had five top-10s on the PGA Tour, but also missed six cuts. He was a controversial wild-card pick by European captain Colin Montgomerie for the 2010 Ryder Cup. He won two matches and lost two matches as Europe regained the Ryder Cup. It was his sixth Ryder Cup and fourth time being on the winning team. He won his first tournament in two years at the Iskandar Johor Open in Malaysia on the Asian Tour. He finished the year ranked 25th in the world.

Harrington started his 2011 season with an opening round 65, for a first round lead at the Abu Dhabi HSBC Golf Championship on the European Tour. He was later disqualified before his second round commenced, after a spectator telephoned in and pointed out an incident of his ball moving an exceptionally small distance closer to the hole on the green, while he was replacing his ball marker, during the first round; it had been shown on television. (The incident led to a rules review, and if it were to occur again, would not be a penalty.) He missed the cut at the Masters Tournament and finished tied for 45th at the U.S. Open. In June 2011, he dropped outside the top 50 in the World Rankings for the first time since 1999.

Harrington made his first start of the 2012 PGA Tour season at the AT&T Pebble Beach National Pro-Am where he finished joint top of the Pro-Am leaderboard, alongside partner J.P. McManus, with Brian Harman and Greg Ontiveros. Harrington also enjoyed a good finish in the overall tournament with a tied for seventh finish. In March 2012, Harrington shot a 61 in the first round of the Transitions Championship to set a new course record at the Copperhead Course. This was also Harrington's lowest ever round on the PGA Tour. He could not maintain his brilliant first day's play over the remaining three rounds though and finished in a tie for 20th place.

In April 2012, at the first major of the year, The Masters, Harrington shot five under for the last six holes in his third round to close to within three shots of the lead. In the final round, he shot a level par round of 72 to finish tied for 8th. It was Harrington's first top-10 finish in a major since the 2009 PGA Championship.

At the 2012 U.S. Open, Harrington was in contention to win a fourth major championship, when rounds of 74-70-71 on the first three days got him into contention on Sunday. After bogeying two of the first six holes, Harrington preceded to play the stretch from hole 7–17 in 5-under-par to find himself two behind the leader. Needing a birdie at the last to finish ahead of the clubhouse leader Michael Thompson, Harrington took the pin on at the 18th and found a plugged lie in the greenside bunker, which resulted in a bogey finish at 3-over-par. Ultimately this did not cost him the championship as he finished two shots behind Webb Simpson on 1-over-par. Harrington later stated that he thought he had to birdie the last to get to 1-over-par as the reason for taking such an aggressive line on the 18th. He eventually finished in a tie for fourth place, which represented his best showing at a U.S. Open.

In October 2012 Harrington won the PGA Grand Slam of Golf despite having not won a major championship during the year, having been a late replacement for Open champion Ernie Els.

Harrington endured difficult 2013 and 2014 seasons finishing outside of the top 60 on the European Tour Race to Dubai in both years and outside of the top 130 on the PGA Tour FedEx Cup in both years. During this period his Official World Golf Ranking fell to an 18-year low of 385 as of 1 December 2014. In December 2014 he won the Bank BRI Indonesia Open on the Asian Tour for his first official win for 4 years.

In March 2015, Harrington won his first title on the European or PGA Tours in seven years at the Honda Classic. He defeated rookie Daniel Berger on the second extra hole of a sudden-death playoff. Harrington had started the 2014–15 season without full playing privileges after finishing 188th in the FedEx Cup. Harrington was the second consecutive player ranked 297th in the world to win on the PGA Tour, after James Hahn won the Northern Trust Open the week before. The victory qualified Harrington for the Masters having missed out on the event in 2014 for the first time since he made his debut in 2000. This also moved him back into the world's top 100.

In August 2016, Harrington represented Ireland at the 2016 Summer Olympics, finishing in a tie for the 21st place. On 23 October 2016, Harrington won the Portugal Masters by one stroke. It was his first win on the European Tour since 2008.

On 8 January 2019, Harrington was named as the captain for the 2020 Ryder Cup. The Ryder Cup was delayed one year due to the COVID-19 pandemic. The European team lost 19–9.

In 2022, Harrington started playing on the PGA Tour Champions. He finished second to Steve Stricker in his first senior major, The Tradition. On 26 June 2022, he won his first senior major, the U.S. Senior Open, beating Stricker by one stroke.

In March 2023 it was announced that Harrington would be elected World Golf Hall of Fame as part of the Class of 2024.

Personal life
Harrington has known his wife Caroline since childhood. They were married in 1997 and have two sons: Patrick, born in 2003, and Ciarán, born in November 2007.

Harrington's eldest brother, Tadhg, is a professional golf coach who owns and teaches at the Harrington Golf Academy in Dublin, Ireland.

Harrington is a distant cousin of former NFL quarterback Joey Harrington and 1995 World Series of Poker champion and author Dan Harrington.

Harrington's given name "Pádraig" is the Irish Language version of the name Patrick, which is in common usage in Ireland. His four older brothers have Irish names as well (Tadhg, Columb, Fintan, and Fergal).

Harrington's caddy since 2004 is Ronan Flood. Flood married Susie Gregan, the sister of Harrington's wife, in 2007.

After leaving school, Harrington mixed amateur golf with studying Accounting. He passed his final exams in 1994 to gain admittance to ACCA (Association of Chartered Certified Accountants).

Harrington has undergone laser eye surgery in a bid to improve his game.

In February 2021, Harrington was diagnosed with COVID-19.

Charity work
Harrington became a Global Ambassador for Special Olympics, the world's largest sports organisation for people with intellectual disabilities, in May 2010. He has conducted a number of golf clinics for Special Olympics athletes and coaches.

Harrington is patron of Irish charity Oesophageal Cancer Fund (OCF) since 2006, having lost his father to oesophageal cancer in 2005. He actively promotes Lollipop Day, the designated day for oesophageal cancer fundraising in Ireland celebrated every February and raises funds through various events and activities through The Pádraig Harrington Charitable Foundation, which are distributed to deserving beneficiaries throughout Ireland and the rest of the world.

Amateur wins
1991 Sherry Cup
1994 West of Ireland Amateur Championship
1995 Irish Amateur Open Championship, Irish Amateur Close Championship
Leinster Boys Championship

Professional wins (36)

PGA Tour wins (6)

PGA Tour playoff record (3–1)

European Tour wins (15)

*Note: The 2001 Volvo Masters Andalucía was shortened to 54 holes due to weather.
1Co-sanctioned by the  Asian Tour

European Tour playoff record (4–4)

Japan Golf Tour wins (1)

Japan Golf Tour playoff record (1–0)

Asian Tour wins (4)

1Co-sanctioned by the European Tour

Asian Tour playoff record (0–1)

Other wins (11)

Other playoff record (3–2)

PGA Tour Champions wins (4)

European Senior Tour wins (1)

Major championships

Wins (3)

1Defeated García in a four-hole playoff by 1 stroke: Harrington (3-3-4-5=15), García (5-3-4-4=16)

Results timeline
Results not in chronological order in 2020.

CUT = missed the half-way cut
"T" = tied for place
NT = No tournament due to COVID-19 pandemic

Summary

Most consecutive cuts made – 8 (1999 Open Championship – 2001 Open Championship)
Longest streak of top-10s – 3 (2002 Masters – 2002 Open Championship)

Results in The Players Championship

CUT = missed the halfway cut
"T" indicates a tie for a place

Results in World Golf Championships
Results not in chronological order before 2015.

1Cancelled due to 9/11

QF, R16, R32, R64 = Round in which player lost in match play
"T" = tied
NT = No tournament
Note that the HSBC Champions did not become a WGC event until 2009.

Senior major championships

Wins (1)

Results timeline

"T" indicates a tie for a place
NT = No tournament due to COVID-19 pandemic

Team appearances
Amateur
Jacques Léglise Trophy (representing Great Britain & Ireland): 1988 (winners), 1989 (winners)
European Amateur Team Championship (representing Ireland): 1991, 1993, 1995
Walker Cup (representing Great Britain & Ireland): 1991, 1993, 1995 (winners)
European Youths' Team Championship (representing Ireland): 1992,
St Andrews Trophy (representing Great Britain and Ireland): 1992 (winners), 1994 (winners)

Professional
Alfred Dunhill Cup (representing Ireland): 1996, 1997, 1998, 1999, 2000
World Cup (representing Ireland): 1996, 1997 (winners), 1998, 1999, 2000, 2001, 2002, 2003, 2004, 2005, 2006
Ryder Cup (representing Europe): 1999, 2002 (winners), 2004 (winners), 2006 (winners), 2008, 2010 (winners), 2021 (non-playing captain)
Record: 25 matches, 10.5 points
All formats (W–L–H): 9–13–3 = 10.5 pts
Singles: 3–3–0 = 3 pts
Foursomes: 3–4–3 = 4.5 pts
Fourballs: 3–6–0 = 3 pts
Seve Trophy (representing Great Britain & Ireland): 2000, 2002 (winners), 2003 (winners), 2005 (winners)

Awards and honours
International:
2006:
European Tour Order of Merit
2007:
European Tour Golfer of the Year
Association of Golf Writers Player of the Year
2008:
PGA Player of the Year
PGA Tour Player of the Year
European Tour Golfer of the Year
Golf Writers Association of America (GWAA) Player of the Year
Association of Golf Writers Player of the Year
European Tour Shot of the Year – 5w on 71st Hole in Open Championship
2022:
PGA Tour Champions Rookie of the Year
National:
1996 Texaco Ireland Sportstar Golf Award
1999 Texaco Ireland Sportstar Golf Award
2001 Texaco Ireland Sportstar Golf Award
2002 Texaco Ireland Sportstar Golf Award, RTÉ Sports Person of the Year
2004 Texaco Ireland Sportstar Golf Award (shared with Darren Clarke & Paul McGinley)
2005 Texaco Ireland Sportstar Golf Award
2006 Texaco Ireland Sportstar Golf Award
2007 Texaco Ireland Sportstar Golf Award, RTÉ Sports Person of the Year
2008 Texaco Ireland Sportstar Golf Award, Irish Golf Writers Professional of the Year Award, RTÉ Sports Person of the Year

See also
List of golfers with most European Tour wins
List of golfers with most PGA Tour wins
List of men's major championships winning golfers
List of people on stamps of Ireland
Golf in Ireland

References

External links

Irish Examiner.com – "The making of a Major champion" – 28 July 2007

Irish male golfers
European Tour golfers
PGA Tour golfers
Winners of men's major golf championships
Winners of senior major golf championships
Ryder Cup competitors for Europe
Olympic golfers of Ireland
Golfers at the 2016 Summer Olympics
RTÉ Sports Person of the Year winners
People educated at Coláiste Éanna
Sportspeople from Dublin (city)
21st-century Irish people
1971 births
Living people